Heaven's Gate is the first album by Norwegian heavy metal band Keldian. It was released worldwide in February 2007 by American label Perris Records, and was produced, engineered and mixed by Arild Aardalen.

Heaven's Gate was also released as a Japanese version, featuring a slightly remixed version of the song "Plains of Forever" as well as the bonus track "Hope".

Track listing
All songs written by Christer Andresen and Arild Aardalen.
"Crusader" - 3:33
"Heart of the Sun" - 3:54
"Requiem for the Light" - 3:54
"Heaven's Gate" - 4:20
"Redshift" - 5:57
"Salvation (Release Me)" - 4:53
"Sundancer" - 4:31
"Prophecy" - 4:17
"Beyond the Stars" - 3:39
"Plains of Forever" - 8:41
"Hope" (Japanese version only)

Band
 Christer Andresen - vocals, guitars, bass
 Arild Aardalen - keyboards, additional vocals

Featured musicians
 Jørn Holen - drums
 Maja Svisdahl - vocals
 Gunhild Mathea Olaussen - violin
 Mats Rybø - vocals
 H-man - spoken words

References

2006 albums
Keldian albums